Metallogenium is a proposed genus of bacteria that has an affinity to form star-shaped manganese oxide minerals. The organism is supposedly observed in limnic environments. The species is currently not assigned to any taxonomic family.

References

Further reading

Manganese minerals
Mineralogy
Bacteria